Joseph P. Bradley Jr. (November 27, 1926 – January 8, 1994) is a former Democratic member of the Pennsylvania House of Representatives.
 He was born in 1926 in Shamokin, Pennsylvania.

References

Democratic Party members of the Pennsylvania House of Representatives
1994 deaths
1926 births
20th-century American politicians